Pierre Part is a census-designated place (CDP) in Assumption Parish, Louisiana, United States. The population was 3,169 at the 2010 census, making it the most populous community in Assumption Parish. With 39.3 percent of the population speaking French at home, Pierre Part is the most French town in the United States (by percentage) outside of Maine. Pierre Part is known locally for its prominent French influence and ancestry, which have become significant aspects of its contemporary local culture. Situated near Lake Verret, Pierre Part is a popular local destination for water sports and fishing during the summer.

History

Pierre Part was founded by Acadian French settlers after the Great Upheaval of 1755, during which much of the French population of Acadia was expelled by its British conquerors. The town remained isolated from most of the world, since it was surrounded by water and was inaccessible by land until the mid-twentieth century. Before the Great Depression, the inhabitants of Pierre Part were fishermen; after the Depression, many men of the town were forced to find work in other fields including logging, levee building, and the growing petroleum industry in Louisiana. Fewer people continue the traditional ways of fishing and living off the land with each generation.

Pierre Part experienced flooding when the Morganza Spillway was opened during the 1973 Mississippi River flooding.

The people of Pierre Part are predominantly of French ancestry, of families who either came directly from France or those whose came from Canada (Acadia), and before that, France. Until the early- to mid-twentieth century the people almost exclusively spoke Cajun French at home. This caused the people of Pierre Part and the rest of the Cajun community to be labeled as "backwards" or "ignorant" by outsiders, and in many cases from the 1910s to the 1970s, students whose first language was French were punished corporally in school for speaking it. From the 1970s onward, extremely few children were taught Cajun French as a first language, since the previous generations were taught to be ashamed of their heritage. In the 1990s an effort was made to reintroduce French into the school systems. This became somewhat controversial as the French taught in school was not Cajun French. Many of the teachers brought in were Belgian, French, and Canadian who taught their own dialect of French. However, there are still many who contend that the Standard French taught in French Immersion classes at Pierre Part Elementary School is the best chance that local Cajuns have at preserving their language and culture, since there is no written standard for teaching the Cajun dialect of the French language.

The History Channel's reality show, Swamp People, features the Landry family, a Cajun family who lives in Pierre Part; the series debuted on History in 2010.

On August 3, 2012, the Bayou Corne Sinkhole, situated roughly 3 miles from Pierre Part, appeared. In areas of Pierre Part near the sinkhole, residents reported gaseous odors and strange bubbling in local waterways, prompting Governor Bobby Jindal to issue an evacuation order for the nearby community of Bayou Corne. The sinkhole expanded significantly during the months after it first appeared, invoking fear in residents of Pierre Part due to what was perceived to be an imminent threat to the community. Significantly, the sinkhole continued to grow in the direction of Louisiana Highway 70, the main highway on which most residents drove. Public outrage to the events in Bayou Corne was largely directed towards Texas Brine Company, the salt mining company perceived to be chiefly responsible for the disaster; a class-action lawsuit against Texas Brine ensued. However, a 2018 court ruling declared the fault to be shared between three companies: Occidental Chemical was 50% at fault, Texas Brine was 35% at fault, and Vulcan was 15% at fault. As of 2019, the sinkhole continues to expand, albeit slowly, and the community of Bayou Corne remains deserted, with most homes demolished by demolition companies.

Geography
Pierre Part is located at  (29.960975, -91.206612).

Demographics

2020 census

As of the 2020 United States census, there were 3,024 people, 1,099 households, and 625 families residing in the CDP.

2010 census
As of the census of 2010, there were 3,169 people, 1,288 households, and 916 families residing in the CDP. The racial makeup of the CDP was 98.6% White, 0.03% African American, 0.22% Native American, and 0.9% from two or more races. Hispanic or Latino of any race amounted to 1.0% of the population. In 2005, 60.7% of the population over age 5 spoke English at home, and 38.8% of the population spoke French.

There were 1,236 households, out of which 39.4% had children under the age of 18 living with them, 62.0% were married couples living together, 9.7% had a female householder with no husband present, and 24.9% were non-families. 22.1% of all households were made up of individuals, and 9.8% had someone living alone who was 65 years of age or older. The average household size was 2.62 and the average family size was 3.06.

In the CDP, the population was spread out, with 27.3% under the age of 18, 9.4% from 18 to 24, 29.9% from 25 to 44, 22.2% from 45 to 64, and 11.2% who were 65 years of age or older. The median age was 35 years. For every 100 females, there were 94.5 males. For every 100 females age 18 and over, there were 91.9 males.

In 2017, the median household income for Pierre Part was $82,646, and the median income for a family was $90,721. Males had a median income of $69,203 versus 33,371 for females. The per capita income for the CDP was $32,875. 8.3% of families and 11.2% of the population were below the poverty line, including 12.2% of those under age 18 and 9.1% of those age 65 and over.

As of 2017, 53.4% of people residing in Pierre Part reported French ancestry. 13.1% had French Canadian ancestry. A total of 7.1% of residents declared German ancestry, which was followed by 6.0% Irish ancestry and 4.0% English ancestry. 1.7% of individuals reported having Irish ancestry.

In the CDP, 74.1% of households had a computer, and 73.9% of residents regularly used the Internet.

Education
Pierre Part is part of the Assumption Parish public school system.
 Pierre Part Primary School
 Pierre Part Middle School
 Assumption High School (located in Napoleonville)

Transportation 
Louisiana Highway 70 runs through Pierre Part and serves as its main highway. Other highways that serve the community include Louisiana 997, Louisiana 1015-1, Louisiana 1015-2, Louisiana 1016-1, and Louisiana 1016-2.

Notable People 

Karen St. Germain, Democratic politician and former member of the Louisiana House of Representatives
Troy Landry, TV personality starring in Swamp People. Nicknamed "King of the Swamp" in the series.

References

Census-designated places in Louisiana
Census-designated places in Assumption Parish, Louisiana
Populated places established in 1755